Albany, derived from the Gaelic for Scotland, most commonly refers to:
Albany, New York, the capital of the State of New York and largest city of this name
Albany, Western Australia,  port city in the Great Southern  

Albany may also refer to:

Arts and music
 "Albany" (1981), a German language schlager by the British singer Roger Whittaker
 Albany Theatre (formerly the Albany Empire), in Deptford, South London, England

Organizations and institutions

England
 Albany Academy, Chorley
 Hornchurch High School, London, formerly The Albany School

United States

Georgia
 Albany Movement, desegregation coalition formed in Albany, Georgia in 1961
 Albany State University, Albany

New York
 Albany Great Danes, the athletic program of the University at Albany
 Albany Records, a record label in Albany
 Albany Symphony Orchestra
 University at Albany, SUNY

People
 Albany Leon Bigard, better known as Barney Bigard, a jazz musician
 Duke of Albany, a Scottish, and later, British peerage title
 Regent Albany (disambiguation), several Dukes of Albany who were regent of Scotland
 Michel Roger Lafosse, or Michael James Alexander Stewart of Albany, a claimant to the Scottish throne

Places

Australia
 Albany, Western Australia, a city
 City of Albany, Western Australia, a local government area
 Electoral district of Albany, Western Australia
 Albany Creek, Queensland, a suburb of Brisbane
 Albany Island, off Cape York Peninsula, Queensland

Bahamas
 Albany, New Providence

Canada
 Albany, Edmonton, Alberta
 Albany, Nova Scotia
 Albany, Prince Edward Island
 Albany River, in Ontario
 Fort Albany First Nation, Ontario

New Zealand
 Albany, New Zealand, a suburb of Auckland
 Albany (New Zealand electorate), existed between 1978 and 2002

South Africa
 Albany, South Africa, a region in the Eastern Cape named after the capital of New York State

United Kingdom
 Albany, Tyne and Wear, a suburb of Washington
 Albany (Liverpool), formerly a meeting place for cotton brokers, now divided into apartments
 Albany (London), a famous apartment complex in London
 HM Prison Albany, a Category B men's prison on the Isle of Wight

United States 
 Lake Albany, a prehistoric proglacial lake

By state, A to M 
 Albany, California
 Albany, Georgia
 Albany, Illinois
 Albany Park, Chicago, Illinois
 Albany, Indiana
 New Albany, Indiana
 Albany, Iowa, in Westfield Township, Fayette County
 Albany, Kentucky
 Albany, Louisiana
 Albany, Minnesota
 Albany, Missouri
 Albany, Ray County, Missouri

By state, N to Z 
 Albany, New Hampshire
 Albany, New York, the state capital
 Albany, Ohio
 Albany, Oklahoma
 Albany, Oregon
 Albany, Pennsylvania
 Albany, Texas
 Albany, Vermont, a town
 Albany (village), Vermont, a village in the town
 Albany, Green County, Wisconsin, a town
 Albany, Wisconsin, a village in the town
 Albany, Pepin County, Wisconsin, a town
 Albany, Wyoming

Transportation

Air
 Albany Airport (disambiguation), a list of airports associated with places named Albany

Ships
 Albany (sternwheeler 1868), operated on the Willamette River in Oregon, United States, wrecked 1875
 HMS Albany, the name of three ships of the Royal Navy
 HMAS Albany (ACPB 86), an Armidale–class patrol boat of the Royal Australian Navy
 MV Empire Albany, later renamed Albany
 USS Albany, the name of six ships of the US Navy, all named for Albany, New York

Road
 Albany (1903 automobile), an early British automobile
 Albany (1907 automobile), an early American automobile
 Albany (automobile), an English car of the 1970s with "veteran styling"

Rail
 Albany station (Oregon)
 Albany–Rensselaer station, New York

See also
 Alba, the Scottish Gaelic name for Scotland, also anglicized as Albany
 Albany County (disambiguation)
 Albany Empire (disambiguation)
 Albany Township (disambiguation)
 New Albany (disambiguation)
 Albania (disambiguation)
 Albanian (disambiguation)
 Albanians (disambiguation)